Katariina ja Munkkiniemen kreivi (Katariina and the Count of Munkkiniemi) is a 1943 Finnish film directed by Ossi Elstelä.  It is based on a novel by Kaarina Viitainoja. The film stars Regina Linnanheimo, Leif Wager, Elsa Rantalainen, Ester Toivonen and Eino Kaipainen. This film was Wager's first major feature film, and as a result he became one of the most popular Finnish male actors of the 1940s.

The film is set in Helsinki in 1860. The plot is about the love between Katariina, a farmhand's daughter, and Count Mauritz Armborg of Munkkiniemi. The film's most famous scene features the "Romance", which Count Mauritz sings in a park by the pond to Katariina, with music by Nils-Eric Fougstedt and lyrics by Reino Hirviseppä.

The film was first shown on Finnish television on 1 October 1965, and attracted approximately half a million viewers.  A screening in July of the next year attracted about 1.36 million viewers. The film has been issued on VHS and DVD.

Cast
 Regina Linnanheimo - Katariina, a farmhand's daughter
 Leif Wager - Count Mauritz Armborg
 Elsa Rantalainen - Countess Yvonne Armborg
 Ester Toivonen - Countess Margareta Armborg
 Sirkka Sipilä - Ingeborg Liliecrona
 Eino Kaipainen - Elias Jahnukainen, a fisherman
 Sasu Haapanen - Hans, a driver
 Irja Kuusla - Eriikka, a maid
 Aku Käyhkö - Count Liliecrona
 Kaisu Leppänen - Elisabeth Gerhard, wife of the governor
 Hilly Lindqvist - Mrs. Jahnukaisen
 Liisa Nevalainen - Arviida, the Gerhard's handmaiden
 Verna Piponius - Countess Ebba Liliecrona
 Jalmari Rinne - Count Fredrik Armborg
 Yrjö Tuominen - Gerhard, the governor
 Orvokki Lahtinen - Margareta's daughter
 Veikko Linna - chef
 Vilho Jägermalm - lackey
 Jarl Malmstén - lackey
 Bertil Holmström - lackey 
 Edvin Kajanne - lackey
 Regina Heinonen - housemaid
 Eva Hemming - guest at the dance
 Laila Jokimo - guest at the dance
 Onni Korhonen - guest at the dance
 Aino Angerkoski - guest at the dance
 Uuno Montonen - innkeeper
 Vilho Kekkonen - handyman at the inn
 Kaija Suonio - mistress of the inn
 Eino Salmi - ships mate
 Matti Lehtelä - ship's captain
 Olavi Suominen - seaman
 Eeva Savonen - nurse in Copenhagen
 Jukka Feodorow - street singer
 Varma Lahtinen - assistant's wife
 Marjo Kuusla - young Mauritz
 Aino Mattila - Ms Jansson

Plot
The story begins in the year 1860.  The young Count of Munkkiniemi, Mauritz Armborg, and Katariina, the daughter of a farmhand on the estate of the Count's family, are attracted to each other.  However, the count's grandmother, Yvonne Armborg, objects to the romance and tries to obstruct it. Elias Jahnukainen, a fisherman, is himself in love with Katariina and wants to marry her, but she has demurred at his marriage proposals to date.  Count Mauritz dreams of making a career as a violinist and wants to study music abroad. To try to divert Katariina away from her grandson, Countess Yvonne offers to finance Katariina's dowry if she is willing to marry Elias.  In addition, Countess Yvonne introduces the young count to Ingeborg Liliecrona.  However, Mauritz is not attracted to Ingeborg.

Mauritz and Katariina plan to elope, and make their way to Copenhagen and Rome. The lovers meet at an inn, and spend the evening together. At dawn, Mauritz leaves Katariina an old family heirloom, a necklace. However, a servant to Yvonne informs her of the lovers' plans. The lovers are intercepted before they can travel together to Copenhagen. Katariina is escorted back, apart from Mauritz.

Unhappy at being separated from Mauritz, she tries to commit suicide by jumping off a cliff, but Elias saves her. She then accedes to a marriage with Elias. Separately, Mauritz has continued his journey to Copenhagen, where he is confined for several weeks because of a severe illness. Ingeborg travels to Copenhagen, meets Mauritz, and falsely tells him that Katariina will arrive in Rome in the company of Countess Yvonne. However, upon their arrival in Rome, Mauritz meets Countess Yvonne, who has traveled alone.  She tells him that Katariina has married Elias, which leaves Mauritz distraught.

Katariina and Elias have moved into the lower-income Katajanokan district. She has given birth to a son, whom she names Mauritz. Even though the Count is the biological father, Elias promises to treat the son as his own.

Seven years pass. Mauritz and Ingeborg have married, but Mauritz is unhappy because he is still in love with Katariina. At the end of the 1860s, Finland is enduring famine, and plague. Katariina writes a letter of intent to gain admission for her son into a good school, but her application fails, because Elias is of too low a social station.

One day, young Mauritz disappears. Katariina finds him at the house of the governor's wife, Elisabeth Gerhard, whose own son has died. Elisabeth offers to take care of young Mauritz. Katariina objects, but changes her mind after the death of her husband Elias from the plague. Katariina leaves young Mauritz in the care of Elisabeth, and also leaves the necklace with him. Elisabeth and young Mauritz travel to Rome, where young Mauritz meets Count Mauritz. He sees the necklace with young Mauritz, and realises that he is Katariina's son, and thus his own son.

The marriage between Count Mauritz and Ingeborg finally collapses, as the Count has requested permission to travel to Finland with young Mauritz. Ingeborg agrees to a divorce. Count Mauritz and young Mauritz return to Munkkiniemi to a solemn welcome. Count Mauritz plans to apologise to Countess Yvonne, who in her turn has since repented of her scheme to keep Count Mauritz and Katariina apart. When Countess Yvonne meets young Mauritz, she immediately feels great affection for him.  Upon seeing the necklace in his possession, she realises that the child is her kin. In the meantime, Katariina has also learned of her son's return to Finland.

One day, Count Mauritz is walking in a park where he and Katariina spent past days of their time together. He begins to sing the "Romance", a song that they both loved. Unbeknownst to him, Katariina is in the same park, and hears the song. The couple finally reunite, as Count Mauritz asks Katariina to come home with him, to "our home".

References

1943 films
Films set in Helsinki
1940s romance films
Finnish black-and-white films
Films set in 1860
Films about nobility
1940s Finnish-language films